Major-General Frederick Markham CB (16 August 1805 – 21 December 1855) was a British Army officer who served as Adjutant-General in India.

Military career
Born the son of Admiral John Markham and educated at Westminster School, Marham was commissioned as an ensign in the 32nd Regiment of Foot on 13 May 1824. He fought at the Battle of Saint-Denis in November 1837 during the Lower Canada Rebellion and then commanded the 2nd Infantry Brigade at the Siege of Multan in Winter 1848 and at the Battle of Gujrat in February 1849 during the Second Anglo-Sikh War. He served as Adjutant-General in India from April 1854 until December 1854 and was then despatched to command the 2nd Division at the Siege of Sevastopol in Spring 1855 during the Crimean War. He returned to England in September 1855 but died in December 1855.

References

Sources

British Army generals
1805 births
1855 deaths
Companions of the Order of the Bath
32nd Regiment of Foot officers